MTK Budapest created a fencing section on 17 October 1908, which had one of the most successful teams in Hungary.

Achievements

Current squad

Technical and Managerial Staff
Fencing team officials according to the official website:

Athletes

Men's squad

Women's squad

Fencing Hall
Name: Lantos Mihály Sporttelep
City: Budapest, Hungary
Address: H-1149 Budapest, XIV. district, Rákospatak u. 13-27.

International success

Olympic medalists
The team's olympic medalists are shown below.

See also
Hungarian Fencer of the Year

References

External links
Fencing section website 
Official MTK Budapest website 

MTK Budapest
Sports clubs established in 1908
Fencing clubs